Rabee may refer to:

Abu al-Aas ibn al-Rabee (died 634), son-in-law and companion of the Islamic prophet Muhammad
Rabee Allafi, Libyan footballer
Rabee Al-Mousa (born 1984), Saudi Arabian professional footballer
Sa'ad ibn Al-Rabee, sahaba (companion) of the Islamic prophet Muhammad
Rabee Ataya (born 1989), Lebanese professional footballer
Abu Bakr Rabee Ibn Ahmad Al-Akhawyni Bokhari (died 983), Persian physician, author of the Hidayat al-Muta`allemin Fi al-Tibb
Rabee Jaber (born 1972), Lebanese novelist and journalist, born in Beirut, Lebanon
Ahmed Rabee (born 1995), Emirati footballer
Ismail Rabee (born 1983), Emirati footballer
Mohammed Rabee (born 1982), Saudi football player
Rabee al-Madkhali, former head of the Sunnah Studies Department at the Islamic University of Madinah
Younis Abdallah Rabee, (born 1948), Kuwaiti sprinter
Ahmed Rabee El Sheikh (born 1993), Egyptian professional footballer
Rabee Sufyani (born 1987), Saudi football player